Lukáš Klimek (born November 14, 1986) is a Czech professional ice hockey player. He played with HC Vítkovice in the Czech Extraliga during the 2010–11 Czech Extraliga season.

References

External links

1986 births
Czech ice hockey forwards
HC Vítkovice players
Living people
Sportspeople from Ostrava
HC RT Torax Poruba players
HC Olomouc players
Indiana Ice players
HC Sparta Praha players
Czech expatriate ice hockey players in the United States